The Centaur Theatre Company is a theatre company based in Montreal, Quebec.  It was co-founded in 1969 by Maurice Podbrey along with The Centaur Foundation for the Performing Arts. It currently has Eda Holmes as the Artistic and Executive Director, and Michael Baratta as Chairman of the Board.

Podbrey retired from the company in 1997, and was succeeded by Gordon McCall.  From 2007 to 2017 Roy Surette was the company's third Artistic and Executive Director. In 2017 Michael Baratta was named Chairman of the Board as well as Eda Holmes being appointed the forth and current position of Artistic and Executive Director.

The Centaur is the city's main English-language only theatre company.

From 1969 to 1973 the company leased the partially renovated auditorium in the historic building.  In 1974 the Centaur purchased the building and spent $1.3 million in renovations under the design of architect Victor Prus.

The building reopened in 1975 with an additional auditorium.  The original black box theatre was renamed "C1", and seats approximately 245 people.  The newer venue was named "C2" and is a more traditional proscenium stage, seating approximately 425.

Old Stock Exchange Building

The Centaur Theatre is located in the Old Stock Exchange Building, formerly home to the Montreal Stock Exchange (MSE). It was built in 1903 by American architect George B. Post. The building served as the home of the MSE until 1965.

References
Rémillard, François, Old Montreal — A Walking Tour, Ministère des Affaires culturelles du Québec,  1992

External links
 Centaur Theatre Company
 Canadian Encyclopedia article

1969 establishments in Quebec
Quebec Anglophone culture in Montreal
Landmarks in Montreal
History of Montreal
Old Montreal
Beaux-Arts architecture in Canada
Theatres completed in 1903
Theatres in Montreal